Arthur Franklin Clarke  (1865–1949) was a Major League Baseball player. He played for the New York Giants of the National League in 1890–1891. He played college ball at Brown University and Williams College.

Sources

Sportspeople from Brookline, Massachusetts
Major League Baseball catchers
Major League Baseball outfielders
Major League Baseball third basemen
Major League Baseball second basemen
New York Giants (NL) players
Baseball players from Providence, Rhode Island
1865 births
1949 deaths
Newburyport Clamdiggers players
Troy Trojans (minor league) players
Williams Ephs baseball players
19th-century baseball players